Arsinoe was an ancient city in northwestern Cyprus built on top of the older city, Marion; some ancient writers conflate the two cities.

Ptolemy I Soter destroyed the town of Marion in 312 BCE and removed some inhabitants to Paphos. The city was refounded by Ptolemy Philadelphus and named after his sister/wife Arsinoe.

According to Strabo there was a grove sacred to Zeus.
 
Cyprus, from its subjection to the kings of the Lagid family, had more than one city of this name, which was common to several princesses of that house; see Arsinoe for other cities so named.

The site of Arsinoe is located near modern Polis Chrysochous.

References

Cities in ancient Cyprus
Former populated places in Cyprus
Ptolemaic colonies
Populated places in ancient Cyprus